Charles  Rood Keeran   (April 16, 1883 - June 9, 1948) was an Illinois inventor and businessman.

Biography
He was born on April 16, 1883, on a farm near Bloomington, Illinois. Having an inventive father, William Lee Keeran, C.R. Keeran grew up with a creative spirit.  After achieving a master's degree in engineering, he soon began patenting his ideas (circa 1906) which continued throughout his lifetime:

Keeran's 2-piece vacuum seal for Mason jars, which became the standard for home-canning, was immediately popular.  However, he sold off his company, White Crown Fruit Jar, in order to finance his favorite invention: the Eversharp mechanical pencil.  Around 1914, Keeran invented the basic mechanism for the Eversharp, thought up the "Eversharp" trademark (inspired by the Winchester Rifle logo), and set up a company to make and sell Eversharp pencils. He relocated to Evanston, Illinois, and entered into a business alliance with the Wahl Adding Machine Company in Chicago.  Wahl officers obtained a majority share in the Eversharp Pencil Company and, in 1917, forced Keeran out of the company.

In 1919, Keeran registered the "Autopoint" trademark.  In 1921, Keeran joined three businessmen in the Realite Pencil Company.   Keeran brought the Autopoint name with him. Within a few years the company was renamed, the Autopoint Company.

Keeran felt that his invention and suggestions during his association with Wahl were the basis of their prosperity. For years, he fought a battle to get just compensation from the Wahl Company. He got no satisfaction.

He died on June 9, 1948, in Chicago, Illinois.

Patents
 New and useful Improvements in Detachable Spouts
 New and useful Improvements in Switch and Detector-Bar Throwing Mechanism 
 Certain New and useful Improvements in Weapons 
 Certain New and useful Improvements in Receptacle-Closures  and #1130611, #1167306, #1180929, #1207560, and #1226532
 New and useful Improvements in Lead-Pencils  and #1151016, and #1153115

Further reading
 Frary, C.A. "What We Have Learned Marketing Eversharp." Printers' Ink. 116(6):3+. August 11, 1921.

External links
Charles Keeran, a Mechanical Pencil Pioneer
 Inventor Never Got Rewards of Pencil Business - Pantagraph (Bloomington, IL newspaper) 
A Tale of Two Pencils: Keeran's Eversharp & Hayakawa's Ever-Ready Sharp

References

1883 births
1948 deaths
20th-century American inventors